= Clinical and Applied Thrombosis/Hemostasis =

Clinical And Applied Thrombosis/Hemostasis
- Discipline: Hematology
- Language: English
- Edited by: Charles A. Carter

Publication details
- History: 1995–present
- Publisher: SAGE Publications
- Frequency: Continuous
- Open access: Yes
- Impact factor: 2.9 (2022)

Standard abbreviations
- ISO 4: Clin. Appl. Thromb./Hemost.
- NLM: Clin Appl Thromb Hemost

Indexing
- CODEN: CATHF9
- ISSN: 1076-0296 (print); 1938-2723 (web)
- OCLC no.: 30373737

Links
- Journal homepage; Online access; Online archive

Clinical and Applied Thrombosis/Hemostasis is a peer-reviewed medical journal covering research in the field of hematology. The editor-in-chief is Charles A. Carter. It was established in 1995 and is published by SAGE Publications.

== Abstracting and indexing ==
Clinical and Applied Thrombosis/Hemostasis is abstracted and indexed in Scopus and the Social Sciences Citation Index. According to the Journal Citation Reports, its 2022 impact factor is 2.9.
